Colline d'Élancourt, previously known Colline de la Revanche, is a hill located in Élancourt in the French department of Yvelines. With a height of 231 meters above sea level, it is the highest point in Yvelines and Île-de-France.

The Eiffel Tower, Montparnasse Tower, La Défense, Étang de Saint-Quentin and Meudon Forest are visible from the top of the hill. Colline d'Élancourt was chosen to host the mountain biking events during the 2024 Summer Olympics in Paris.

Toponymy
The name of the place called La Revanche first appeared in 1881. In 2004, the municipal council of Élancourt in 2004 changed the name of the hill to Colline d'Élancourt.

References

Landforms of Yvelines
Hills of France